Gaetano Lanfranchi (April 8, 1901 – April 14, 1983) was an Italian bobsledder who competed in the early 1930s. He was born in Palazzolo sull'Oglio. At the 1932 Winter Olympics in Lake Placid, New York, he finished fifth in the four-man event and eighth in the two-man event.

References
1932 bobsleigh two-man results
1932 bobsleigh four-man results
Gaetano Lanfranchi's profile at Sports Reference.com

1901 births
1983 deaths
Italian male bobsledders
Olympic bobsledders of Italy
Bobsledders at the 1932 Winter Olympics